Guanambi is a municipality in Bahia, Brazil, with an area of 1,272.367 km², and with 84,928 inhabitants in 2020,  according to estimates by the IBGE, making it the 20th most populous municipality of Bahia. It was founded in 1919 and Nilo Coelho is its current mayor.

It is 796 km (approximately 498 miles) south-west of Salvador, the capital being connected by the roads BR-030, BR-262 and BR-324, representing a strong influence in the commercial. The city is served by Guanambi Airport, and it is home of the largest wind complex in Latin America.

Notable people
Lucio (footballer, born 1982)

References

Municipalities in Bahia